John Cage is a fictional character in the television show Ally McBeal, played by Peter MacNicol.

Cage is a main recurring character from Season One to Season Four and a guest starring character in some episodes of Season Five.

Background 

John Cage founded the law firm Cage & Fish along with his best friend Richard Fish (played by Greg Germann). John is initially a shy and reclusive person. However, when Richard hires new associate Ally McBeal, the two become close friends and John slowly becomes a more easy-going, social person. John first meets Ally when she has to defend him in court for hiring a prostitute. After this, the two forge a close personal relationship with Ally often turning to John concerning her insecurities, relationships, and more often than not her hallucinations. It soon turns out that John and Ally both have very vivid imaginations which is the main reason why they get along with each other.

John also proves himself to be an excellent litigator. Although John Cage was famous for using courtroom theatrics and tricks, he demonstrates that he is very knowledgeable about the law, can think quickly and adapt in courtroom proceedings and legal hearings. He is a gifted courtroom speaker, able to pick apart witnesses when cross-examining them and to deliver well-crafted closing arguments to trial juries. Like many intelligent, talented but introverted people, John is often nervous, uncomfortable and awkward in ordinary social situations, but tends to be or at least appear confident and in control in the courtroom or in legal proceedings because he has confidence in his legal abilities. John is often contrasted with his close friend, Richard Fish, who has a very loose interpretation of both legal ethics and ethics governing interpersonal behavior and acted most of the time as though he had very little conscience. John takes pride in his superiority in the court room as it is one of the few places he feels comfortable and confident, proclaiming it to be one of the only places where he knows for certain he won't be ridiculed. John had a pet frog called Steffan whom he has trained to perform several tricks. He later gains a second frog from his colleague Nelle Porter which he calls Millie, as a tribute to the hamster that Nelle had as a child.

To other friends and colleagues such as Jackson Duper and Larry Paul, John often comes across as a 'funny little man'. This thus inspires the nickname by which colleague Ling Woo continually calls him. Close friends also often refer to John by the nickname 'The Biscuit.' Cage told a story of the nickname once, indicating that he had been a chubby child, and that the nickname is a reference to the Pillsbury Doughboy. John also has a few 'catch-phrases'. When he stutters, he often attempts to say "Poughkeepsie" to stop the stammering. However, this often makes the problem worse, with John falling into a 'loop' of stammering which can only be broken when he says a word related to New York. Whenever he feels attracted to a woman, he confides in Richard by telling him: 'Richard, I am drawn to that woman'. In court, John often tells the judge 'this jury pleases me' whenever the jury has given a satisfactory response. When making his closing summation to a jury, in order to emphasize a point he is making, John will often ask the jury to repeat a word he has used, prompting them with the phrase, "Say it with me ..." If John has concerns with something he will express it by saying 'I am troubled'. John is also known for the phrase 'I'm going to take a moment'. These catch-phrases became so recognizable that in one episode a highly agitated Richard yelled at John, 'And if that troubles you then go stand on a railroad and take a moment.' He is often known to say the word "repugnant" when he is disgusted with something.

The character is named after modernist composer John Cage.

John's eccentricities

The dismount 

The law firm of Cage & Fish is famous for its unisex bathroom. A running gag throughout the show is John's falling out of a bathroom stall with the excuse that he is unable to perform his dismount. The dismount is presumably a gymnastic procedure. When he is finally able to do the dismount you see him do a 360 degrees swing on the frame of the toilet cubicle and release in mid air, ending up landing on his feet. However, there have been a great many mishaps with John's dismount. Once, he did not see Ally, began his dismount and knocked Ally into a toilet.

Barry White 

Barry White is John's idol and he cannot perform properly in court or in the bedroom if he cannot draw inspiration from the persona of White. Whenever John needs inspiration he stands in front of a mirror, most often in the unisex bathroom, and starts dancing to White's song "You're the First, the Last, My Everything" which he hears in his mind. Occasionally, John also dances to other songs by White. Whenever other people walk in on John's dancing they often join in. In one episode, he uses this technique to build up his confidence before a sexual encounter with Nelle. But his focus proves to be too effective as he then pictures Nelle as Barry White, even though he speaks with Nelle's voice.

Nose whistle 

John was famous for his nose whistle, a whistling sound he would make, both on purpose and involuntarily, through his nose. The nose whistle was also one of John's tactics for making opposing lawyers nervous in court since John was also capable of making it sound as if the whistle came from someone else's nose.

When John is caught in situations he may find uncomfortable, his nose will sometimes whistle involuntarily.

Remote controls 

John has a remote control that operates one of the toilets in the unisex bathroom. The remote control makes it flush before he enters the room. A later update of his remote control (by Elaine) also puts the toilet seat up and down. John's excuse for the remote control is his much heard excuse "I like a fresh bowl". John also has a remote control for the door to his hole (described in the next section).

Besides the remote control for the toilet bowl, John also has a remote control for his girlfriend Nelle Porter. Due to the significant height difference between the two, John invents remote controlled shoes for Nelle so he just has to push a button for the heels of Nelle's shoes to shorten, thereby making Nelle shorter. Later on he also designs a remote control that controls Nelle's hair pins.

The usage of the remote toilet flusher has also resulted in him unintentionally flushing his pet frog that had escaped from his tank into the sewer.

The hole 

In the bathroom stall that John always uses, the back wall slides back to reveal a small concealed room which John uses to escape from the real world when he needs to think. He hasn't shown the room to anyone when he first shows it to his girlfriend Melanie West (played by Anne Heche). He later also shows the hole to Richard when he wants to strengthen their friendship.

Richard then steals John's hole when John is missing.

John as a trial attorney 

John is portrayed as an extremely accomplished trial attorney, particularly talented in presenting colourful closing arguments and cutting cross-examinations. Whenever someone had a case that was almost impossible to win, they would turn to John. If a case couldn't be won on the merits, John would employ an impressive array of stunts and distraction tactics ranging from his famous nose whistle and creaking shoes to accidentally setting off a blow torch in the court room or having the jury sing along to the song "Ya Got Trouble" from the film The Music Man. This way, John managed to win quite a few cases that would otherwise have been impossible to win.

John prepares the first draft of his closing by walking around in the office bare-foot.

Love life 

When John met his new associate Nelle Porter (played by Portia de Rossi), he immediately confides to Richard that he is "drawn" to her. Nelle finds out because Richard tells her and confronts John after which they start a tentative relationship. However, the relationship brings up many embarrassing situations. One such situation was when John overheard Nelle telling Ling that she had a fantasy of being spanked, after which John decided to be spontaneous and attempts to fulfill Nelle's fantasy. Unfortunately, John failed to hear the part where Nelle told Ling that she did not want the fantasy to become a reality. So when John suddenly started spanking Nelle frantically with a hair brush, Nelle screamed in pain and threw John out of her apartment. After many more arguments and misunderstandings the relationship eventually dissolved.

A while later John starts dating Melanie West (played by Anne Heche), who has Tourette syndrome. The relationship becomes so serious that John eventually asks Melanie to marry him. When she declines because she doesn't believe in marriage and then tells John she isn't capable of spending her entire life with one person, John ends the relationship.

At the beginning of season five John realizes that he is in love with Ally, something he was already thinking about since the first season. He eventually picks up the courage to ask her out but she rejects him. He seems okay with this decision until he discovers that Ally is interested in a newly hired associate named Glenn Foy. John then disappears for 4 episodes. He returns for three episodes but subsequently leaves again on a trip to Mexico. It is then later revealed that John is actually a member of a mariachi band in a Mexican restaurant in Boston.

References

Television characters introduced in 1997
Ally McBeal characters
Fictional lawyers